Jean-Marie Neff (born 29 September 1961 in Sainte-Marie-aux-Mines, Haut-Rhin) is a retired male race walker from France, who competed for his native country at the 1988 Summer Olympics.

Achievements

References
sports-reference

1961 births
Living people
French male racewalkers
Olympic athletes of France
Athletes (track and field) at the 1988 Summer Olympics
Sportspeople from Haut-Rhin